Tarombo is a term for genealogy in Batak culture/language. The Batak believe that they all come from the same ancestor: Siraja Batak, the Batak patriarch. They kept the genealogy line tracing back to this ancestor, called Tarombo Batak. Its origins have been clouded with legends.

References

Batak
Genealogy